Hashim Zaidan Zaidan (born August 13, 1980) is a Qatari professional basketball player.

Career
A 6'10" center, Zaidan plays professionally for the Doha-based Al-Ahli Sports Club.  He participated in the 2006 FIBA World Championship as a member of the Qatar national basketball team, and he recently won a silver medal at the 2006 Asian Games.

References

External links
Qatari National Team at FIBA.com

Qatari men's basketball players
1980 births
Living people
People from Doha
Asian Games medalists in basketball
Basketball players at the 2002 Asian Games
Basketball players at the 2006 Asian Games
Basketball players at the 2010 Asian Games
Centers (basketball)
Asian Games silver medalists for Qatar
Medalists at the 2006 Asian Games
2006 FIBA World Championship players